Ants in the Pants ("Hard Boys") is a 2000 German comedy film directed by Marc Rothemund.

Cast 
 Tobias Schenke - Flo
 Axel Stein - Red Bull
 Luise Helm - Lisa
 Mina Tander - Leonie
  - Kai
  - Schumi
  - Dirk
  - Casper
  - Mutter
  - Vater
  - Winterfeld
 Andrea Sawatzki - Tante Zelda

References

External links 

2000 films
2000 comedy films
2000s teen comedy films
German teen comedy films
Films scored by Johnny Klimek
2000s German-language films
Films directed by Marc Rothemund
2000s German films